The first event of the 2010 World Rowing Cup took place in Lake Bled, Slovenia from May 28–30.

Medal summary

World Cup Standings

References

World Rowing Cup
Rowing World Cup – World Cup 1, 2010
Rowing World Cup 2010 World Cup 1
2010 in Slovenian sport